Keidi Bare (born 28 August 1997) is an Albanian professional footballer who plays as a midfielder for Spanish club Espanyol.

Club career

Apolonia
Born in Fier, Bare started his youth career for Olimpic CF in January 2010 and after 2 and a half seasons there he moved to his hometown's club Apolonia. He progressed through ranks and in the 2013–14 season he played with the under-19 team making 18 appearances in which he scored 4 goals. He was brought at the senior squad for the first time at the age of 16 for the cup match against Tërbuni in which he didn't play. He debuted professionally on 9 November 2013 in the away win over Pogradeci, entering in the second half. In December 2013 he had a trial at Spanish giants Atlético Madrid.

Atlético Madrid
On 26 December 2013, Bare successfully become an Atlético Madrid player after passing the trial at mini-tournament at Tbilisi, Georgia where was also named the best midfielder.

He was brought for the first time to senior squad by manager Diego Simeone in January 2014 for the Copa del Rey match against Las Palmas, where he also debuted by playing in the last minutes in place of Ángel Correa. While at Atlético Madrid B, Bare helped the team's promotion to Segunda División B after beating in a two-legged match Gimnástica de Torrelavega 3–0 on aggregate, with Bare scoring in the second leg.

Bare was assigned to first squad after they were banned from signing new players. He made his first appearance for the 2017–18 season on 25 October by playing as a starter in the 1–1 draw at Elche in the 2017–18 Copa del Rey round of 32.

Málaga
On 31 August 2018, Bare was transferred to Málaga CF and joined their reserve team in the third division. While at Málaga B, Bare was an undisputed starter, playing every match full 90 minutes. However, shortly after, he was promoted to the senior squad, making his debut in the Segunda División on 11 November in the 2–2 away draw against Sporting de Gijón.

Bare established himself as a regular starter for the main squad from January 2019, and featured in both matches of the promotion play-offs as his side was knocked out by Deportivo de La Coruña. On 13 July 2020, he scored his first professional goal in a 2–1 loss at Sporting Gijón.

Espanyol
On 22 September 2020, Bare signed a four-year deal with RCD Espanyol, recently relegated to the second division.

International career

Albania U17
Bare received his first Albania under-17 call up by manager Džemal Mustedanagić for the qualifying round of 2014 UEFA European Under-17 Championship. He played in all three Group A matches as Albania reached elite round.

He was also part of the team in the elite, where Albania was placed in Group 4. He scored his first under-17 goal on 26 March 2014 in the match against Italy which was lost 1–2 where Bare also served as captain. Albania was eliminated after losing the remaining two matches.

Albania U19
In November 2014, he was brought at under-19 squad by manager Altin Lala for the qualifying campaign of 2015 UEFA European Under-19 Championship. He played full-90 minutes in the first two matches against Denmark and Portugal, receiving a yellow card in both matches and reaching completing the number of cards for suspension, and thereby missing the closing match against Wales. Albania was eliminated after losing all three matches.

Albania U21
Bare was called up at the Albania under-21 by manager Redi Jupi for the 2017 UEFA European Under-21 Championship qualification match against Hungary on 13 October 2015. He made his competitive debut on 12 November 2015 in the match against Portugal by replacing Rron Broja. He went on to play another 5 matches as Albania finished 4th in Group 4.

Bare continued to be part of the under-21 squad as he was called up in June for the friendly against France and the opening qualifying match of 2019 UEFA European Under-21 Championship against Estonia.

Senior team
Bare a received call up by manager Gianni De Biasi for the friendly against Bosnia and Herzegovina on 28 March 2017. He finally made a debut on 26 March 2018 in a 1–0 loss against Norway, after coming on as a second-half replacement for Kamer Qaka.

Career statistics

Club

International

References

External links

Profile at the RCD Espanyol website

1997 births
Living people
Sportspeople from Fier
Albanian footballers
Association football midfielders
Albania international footballers
Albania youth international footballers
Kategoria e Parë players
La Liga players
Segunda División players
Segunda División B players
Tercera División players
KF Apolonia Fier players
Atlético Madrid B players
Atlético Malagueño players
Málaga CF players
RCD Espanyol footballers
Albanian expatriate footballers
Albanian expatriate sportspeople in Spain
Expatriate footballers in Spain
Albanian Roman Catholics